Becky Levi is an American female mixed martial artist.

Biography
Levi was born in Coldwater, Michigan. She began her training in Tucson, Arizona, training submissions and judo with Steve Owen, a 7th degree black belt in Judo. She also continued her boxing training at two boxing facilities in Tucson. Becky was also a PE teacher and coach in Tucson for 11 years. She was involved in coaching the sports of volleyball, football, wrestling, and track and field. In 1998 she moved to Grand Ledge, Michigan. to pursue her fight career. Levi has wrestled and boxed at Joe Byrd's Boxing Academy for a year and a half hoping to get started in professional boxing. Although Becky did not get info boxing professionally, she did fight an exhibition fight in Toledo, Ohio. in 2002. Becky also holds a second degree black belt in judo. Prior to MMA competition, she was already an accomplished athlete. At the first 1987 Women's World Championships she won the plus 82 kilograms category in weightlifting. While studying at the University of Arizona, she became a discus thrower, winning the 1988 Tucson Elite Classic and becoming an alternate for the 1988 and 1992 Olympic teams. After graduating, she continued to succeed in the discus, winning the 1992 Willie Williams Classic. In 1991, she attempted judo competition, initially with less success, winning one match out of four at the 1991 Olympic Festival, but eventually becoming a national champion. The Arizona Daily Star called her "one of the two or three greatest female athletes produced here" in an article on the University of Arizona. Becky also competed in 4 World Tough Woman Championships: three of which she was runner up.

Her first entry into the world of mixed martial arts was as a strength and conditioning trainer to fellow Arizona resident Don Frye, present as part of his corner during Ultimate Fighting Championship 8, 9 and 10. In 1999, she helped set up The Danger Zone, a mixed martial arts promotion, with UFC Hall of Famer Dan Severn, who she had assisted in his preparation for UFC V.  Severn would also train Levi for contests such as the Toughwoman World Championships, and said of her in a 1999 interview "She hits harder than most men." They parted ways in 2001 to pursue other business ventures.

Her last fight was a loss by flying armbar against Marloes Coenen at ReMix World Cup 2000, on 5 December 2000. Becky now is the fitness and sport performance co-director at Spiece Fitness a premier fitness facility in Ft. Wayne, IN. Becky has worked and developed their sport training and personal training programs since 2002. Becky is also involved in coaching the throwing events at Indiana Tech University in Fort Wayne, IN.

Career
 1981 National Junior College Champion Shot Put/Runner up discus
 1982 National Junior College Champion Discus/Runner up shot put
 1987 National Champion Women's Weightlifting 82 kg.+
 1987 World Team Trial Champion Weightlifting 82 kg.+
 Pima College Track Hall of Fame Athlete
 USWF Superfight Champion
 L1 Superfight Champion
 IFC Super Heavyweight Champion
 Tough Woman World Champion  3 time Runner-up.

Mixed martial arts record

|-
| Loss
|align=center| 7-1
| Marloes Coenen
| Submission (flying armbar)
| ReMix-World Cup 2000
| 
|align=center| 1
|align=center| 1:25
|
|
|-
| Win
|align=center| 7-0
| Junko Yagi
| Decision (unanimous)
| ReMix-World Cup 2000
| 
|align=center| 2
|align=center| 5:00
|
|
|-
| Win
|align=center| 6-0
| Miwako Ishihara
| Decision (split)
| ReMix-World Cup 2000
| 
|align=center| 2
|align=center| 5:00
|
|
|-
| Win
|align=center| 5-0
| Terri Lukamski
| TKO
| LLPW-Ultimate L-1 Challenge
| 
|align=center| 1
|align=center| 5:06
|
|
|-
| Win
|align=center| 4-0
| Javio Flores
| Submission (choke)
| WSW-World Shoot Wrestling
| 
|align=center| 1
|align=center| 3:07
|
|
|-
| Win
|align=center| 3-0
| Leslie Brace
| Submission (neck crank)
| USWF 7-Unified Shoot Wrestling Federation 7
| 
|align=center| 1
|align=center| 0:40
|
|
|-
| Win
|align=center| 2-0
| Betty Fagan
| TKO
| IFC 4-Akwesasane
| 
|align=center| 1
|align=center| 1:44
|
|
|-
| Win
|align=center| 1-0
| Yoko Takahashi
| Submission (punches)
| U-Japan
| 
|align=center| 1
|align=center| 2:14
|
|

External links
 Becky Levi Awakening Profile

See also
List of female mixed martial artists

References

American female mixed martial artists
Mixed martial artists from Michigan
University of Arizona alumni
Year of birth missing (living people)
Living people
People from Coldwater, Michigan
American female judoka
Mixed martial artists utilizing judo
Mixed martial artists utilizing boxing
Mixed martial artists utilizing wrestling
American female weightlifters
21st-century American women